Florian Stengg (born 25 April 1989) is an Austrian freestyle skier who specializes in the skicross discipline.

He made his World Cup debut in January 2009 in St. Johann in Tirol, finishing 23rd. He followed up with a seventh place in Les Contamines and a twelfth place in Flaine.

He represents the sports club SK Telfs.

References

1989 births
Living people
Austrian male freestyle skiers
Place of birth missing (living people)